Amorbaea is a genus of moths of the family Xyloryctidae.

Species
 Amorbaea hepatica Meyrick, 1908
 Amorbaea subtusvena Diakonoff, [1968]
 Amorbaea subusta Diakonoff, [1968]

References

Xyloryctidae
Xyloryctidae genera
Taxa named by Edward Meyrick